The 2011 Hollywood Casino 400 was a NASCAR Sprint Cup Series stock car race held on October 9, 2011 at Kansas Speedway in Kansas City, Kansas. Contested over 267 laps (but extended due to a Green-white-checker finish) on the 1.5-mile (2.4 km) asphalt quad-oval, it was the thirtieth race of the 2011 Sprint Cup Series season, as well as the fourth race in the ten-race Chase for the Sprint Cup, which ends the season. Jimmie Johnson of Hendrick Motorsports won the race, his second of the season. Kasey Kahne finished second and Brad Keselowski was third.

Background
Kansas Speedway is one of ten intermediate to hold NASCAR races. The track's turns are banked at fifteen degrees, while the front stretch, the location of the finish line, is 10.4 degrees. The back stretch, opposite of the front, is at only five degrees. The racetrack has seats for 82,000 spectators.

Race results

Standings after the race

Drivers' Championship standings

References

Hollywood Casino 400
NASCAR races at Kansas Speedway
Hollywood Casino 400
October 2011 sports events in the United States